

Events
 May 1 – The Kington Tramway, a horse-worked plateway, is opened from Eardisley to Kington, Herefordshire, England. Together with the Hay Railway it forms a continuous system 36 miles (45 km) in length, the longest in the United Kingdom at this date.
 October - John Birkinshaw of Bedlington Ironworks patents improvements in the production of wrought iron rails.
 Thomas Gray publishes his first of five editions of Observations on a General Iron Railway, a book that accelerates the British debate on this means of transportation and promotes the concept of a national rail network.
 An early form of monorail in Russia is operated by Ivan Elmanov in Myachkovo, Moscow Oblast.

Births

January births
 January 21 – Egide Walschaerts, Belgian inventor of a steam locomotive valve gear (d. 1901).

April births
 April 8 - John Taylor Johnston, president of the Central Railroad of New Jersey, 1848–1877 (d. 1893).

May births
 May 2 - Robert Gerwig, German civil engineer, designer of Schwarzwald Railway and the Hell Valley Railway (d. 1885).

July births
 July 31 – John W. Garrett, president of the Baltimore and Ohio Railroad from 1858 (d. 1884).

August births
 August 6 – Donald Smith, afterwards Lord Strathcona, Scottish financier, promoter of the Canadian Pacific Railway (d. 1914).

September births
 September 20 – Alfred Belpaire, Belgian inventor of the Belpaire firebox used on steam locomotives (d. 1893).

December births 
 December 21 – William H. Osborn, president of Illinois Central Railroad 1855–1865, president of Chicago, St. Louis and New Orleans Railroad 1875–1882, is born (d. 1894).

Unknown death dates
James Beatty, Irish engineer who was involved in building the European and North American Railway and the Grand Crimean Central Railway (d. 1856)

Deaths

References